Sir Edward Ridley, PC (20 August 1843 – 14 October 1928) was an English barrister, judge and Conservative politician.

Background and political career
He was born in Stannington, Northumberland, the younger son of Sir Matthew White Ridley, 4th Baronet, and his wife, Hon. Cecilia Ann, eldest daughter of Sir James Parke, afterwards Baron Wensleydale. His eldest brother Matthew succeeded as fifth baronet and was created a viscount in 1900 after serving as Home Secretary.

Ridley was educated at Harrow and Corpus Christi College, Oxford. He was a fellow of All Souls College, Oxford, 1866–1882.

He was MP for South Northumberland from 1878 to 1880.

Legal career

Ridley was called to the bar in 1868 and took silk in 1892. From 1886 to 1897, he was an Official Referee. In 1897, Ridley was appointed a Justice of the High Court and assigned to the King's Bench Division, receiving the customary knighthood.

Ridley had been nominated by Lord Halsbury, who had a reputation for appointing unqualified lawyers to the bench on party political grounds. Ridley's appointment "aroused an exceptional storm of public and private criticism" and "was greeted with horror". The Law Journal said that "[t]he appointment can be defended on no ground whatsoever. It would be easy to name fifty members of the Bar with a better claim." The Solicitors' Journal described it as "a grave mistake" The Law Times wrote that:Unquestionable as are the virtues of Mr. Edward Ridley, Q.C.—for some years the favourite Official referee—no-one will believe that he would have been appointed to the High Court Bench but for his connections... Such an innovation, we repeat, was only possible where the hard-working official, the bearer of so many heavy burdens of the High Court judges, was highly connected. This is Ridleyism. Let it be known hereafter as Ridleyism. It is a curiosity."He resigned from the bench in 1917 and was sworn of the Privy Council.

Assessments 
On Ridley's death, Sir Frederick Pollock had written: "Sir E. Ridley, good scholar, Fellow of All Souls, successful, sicut dicunt [so they say], as an Official Referee, and by general opinion of the Bar the worst High Court judge of our time, ill-tempered and grossly unfair: which is rather a mystery".

Lord Justice MacKinnon called Ridley "the worst judge I have appeared before", saying that "he had a perverse instinct for unfairness".

Personal life
Ridley married Alice Davenport, daughter of William Bromley-Davenport of Cheshire. They had two sons, Edward Davenport Ridley  (1883–1934) and Cecil Guy Ridley  (1885–1947).

References

External links

 

1843 births
1928 deaths
English King's Counsel
UK MPs 1874–1880
Members of the Parliament of the United Kingdom for English constituencies
Knights Bachelor
Alumni of Corpus Christi College, Oxford
Fellows of All Souls College, Oxford
Queen's Bench Division judges
Members of the Privy Council of the United Kingdom
People from Stannington, Northumberland
Official Referees (England and Wales)
People educated at Harrow School